The Battle of Ayta ash-Sha'b took place during the 2006 Lebanon War, when the Israel Defense Forces and the Islamic Resistance, the armed wing of Hezbollah, fought a 33 days battle for the town of Ayta ash-Sha'b and the neighboring villages of Ramiya, al-Qawzah and Dibil in southern Lebanon. The initial phase of the battle consisted of two and a half weeks of intense bombardment by air and artillery, followed by more than two weeks of intensive fighting in and around the town. The IDF deployed five brigades against an Hizbullah force consisting of litte more than half a company. Still the IDF failed to capture the town and suffered relatively heavy casualties in the process.

Background 
On 12 July 2006, under the cover of mortar and rocket fire directed at Israeli communities and IDF positions, forces belonging to the Islamic Resistance launched a cross border raid into Israeli territory, killing three Israeli soldiers and abducting two, Ehud Goldwasser and Eldad Regev. The abductors apparently headed for the town of Ayta ash-Sha'b, less than a kilometer from the site of the abduction.

Nir Rosen writes that Ayta ash-Sha'b was defended by approximately 100 fighters, mainly local inhabitants. Some of the defenders of the town were not members of the Islamic Resistance or even of Hizbullah. According to Andrew Exum, the majority of the fighters were not "regular Hizballah fighters". Blanford agrees that most of the fighters were local residents, but that they were "no second-rate home guard. They were battle-hardened veterans,… many of them with specialist training in anti-armor missiles and sniping." According to a study supported by Israeli authorities, Hizbullah's military infrastructure in the village consisted of 60–70 Hizbullah operatives.

The battle 
Ayta ash-Sha'b and other Lebanese border villages and Hizbullah outposts were immediately subjected to bombardment from aircraft and artillery, plus attack helicopters supporting Israeli ground forces. This would continue almost daily throughout the war. On the first day the IDF declared, somewhat optimistically, that "all Hezbollah outposts along the border were destroyed."

First attempted incursion
Less than two hours after the capture of the two soldiers, the IDF sent a force of tanks and armored personnel carriers across the border following a dirt track, through an olive grove called Khallat al-Warda, leading to Ayta ash-Sha'b. The force was ordered to capture a Hizbullah post and to take control of the exit roads from the town, in case the abducted soldiers were still there. Only 70 meters into Lebanese territory, a Merkava heavy battle tank drove over a remote-controlled mine. The tank was destroyed and its four crewmen were killed instantly, and the mission to capture the access roads to the town was quickly abandoned. Hizbullah fire prevented the extraction of the destroyed tank and the remains of the four soldiers just inside Lebanese territory for several days. A fifth soldier was killed and two soldiers wounded in the effort. Defence Minister Amir Peretz, who watched the tank exploding live on his monitor, was stunned. It was later described as the "Zidane effect" that cemented Israel's resolve towards going to war.

Second attempted incursion
On the evening of 12 July, IDF Northern Command contemplated sending paratroopers to Ayta ash-Sha'b "to conduct arrests". This was postponed because of a lack of intelligence, but during the first week fighting was limited to exchanges of fire over the border. The original plan deemed it unnecessary to occupy Lebanese territory to rid the border of Hizbullah. Israel used the air force, both aircraft and attack helicopters, and artillery fire. The Lebanese fighters fired rockets, guided missiles, mortars, Katyusha rockets and heavy machine guns at Israeli towns and IDF positions. According to Yedioth Ahronoth more than 300 rockets were fired from the area during the war. According to an IDF sponsored study, however, IDF radar detected 156 rockets being launched from inside villages in South Lebanon during the war, but none from Ayta ash-Sha'b.

The headquarters of the 91st Division at Biranit just across the border from Ayta ash-Sha'b was subjected to a "hard and extremely accurate" attack by Katyusha rockets. The Command bunker received a direct hit destroying the generator and cutting off light and air supply to the facility. Only the dim lights of cell phones could be seen when terrified Israeli soldiers called home. According to Islamic Resistance commanders the fighters suffered no casualties during this period.

On 14 July the civilian inhabitants of the town were warned through loudspeakers to evacuate the town. The great majority of the population therefore left. About a week into the war the IDF resumed ground operations around Ayta ash-Sha'b, with nightly incursions by foot, mainly around the Old Quarter in the west and the northern sections of the town, such as the Abu Tawil hill. These incursions were described by Arkin as "probes" and probably served mainly to gather intelligence. On the 19th, Northern Command launched a simultaneous attack on the border communities of Maroun ar-Ras, Marwahin and Ayta ash-Sha'b. The attack on Maroun ar-Ras failed, sustaining a number of casualties, and the forces about to attack Ayta ash-Sha'b were called back at the last moment.

Decision to create a Security Zone
Two weeks into the war it was clear that the Israeli strategy was not working. In late July the Israeli cabinet therefore approved Operation "Operation Web of Steel 4" (later renamed Operation Change of Direction 8), designed to take control of a "security zone", 6–8 kilometers wide, along the border. Reserves were called up and eight brigades amassed on the Israeli-Lebanese border.

On 31 July paratroopers effectively surrounded Ayta ash-Sha'b with the intention of driving out the Hizbullah. They were met with fierce resistance. On the next day they advanced on the town from two directions. One company-sized unit was advancing into the eastern Abu Laban quarter. The troops were discovered by Lebanese forces, which after several hours of fighting forced the Israelis to retreat. During this fight Hizbullah suffered its first fatality, Younis Surour. The other force, the 890th Paratrooper Battalion, attacked the Old Town from the north and advanced towards the Imam Hussein mosque. The battalion came under fire, and its forces got separated as they took cover. Israeli soldiers were shocked by the ferocity of the fire and several stopped functioning. The attack was aborted and reinforcements were called in to extract dead, wounded and shell-shocked soldiers. According to Hizbullah, another Lebanese fighter, Hisham as-Sayyid, was killed while pursuing the retreating Israelis. Three Israeli soldiers, including an officer, were killed and at least 25 were wounded. The IDF had claimed that 15 Hizbullah guerrillas had been killed in the clash, though Hizbullah claimed it only lost two fighters. Israeli injured had to be carried by their comrades, under Hizbullah fire, back to the Israeli border. It took the wounded a whole day to reach the hospital in Nahariya. The Paratroopers were originally supposed to move north the following day but because of the casualties sustained, they were ordered to remain in the vicinity of the town.

Defense Minister Amir Peretz expressed his growing frustration at the slow progress IDF was making to his senior officers: "It's infuriating – we're circling Ayta al-Shaab for the third time already."

Continued street fighting
On 2 August, "harsh battles" were reported inside the town. One Israeli paratrooper was reported killed and nine wounded. On the same day, an Israeli force surrounded a house in the northern Abu Tawil section of the town. When the house was searched, two Hizbullah fighters hiding in the house were discovered and taken prisoner.

Israeli media reports were still upbeat and reported that the IDF "during the day" (Sic) was "set to complete its deployment" in a 5–6 kilometers wide "security zone" along the Lebanese border, all the way between Metula and Rosh Hanikra. Ayta ash-Sha'b, less than a kilometer from the border, was going to prove a much more difficult nut to crack than expected.

The Hizbullah fighters generally fought from well-protected positions. A Hizbullah fighter told Lebanese daily as-Safir after the war how close the Israeli soldiers and Hizbullah guerrillas were, sometimes separated only by an alley or a destroyed house. The first time he saw Israeli soldiers he could not believe his eyes: "They were so close that sometimes our units would overlap theirs". The Israeli soldiers would advance into a neighborhood and seek cover in a building when exposed to fire. The fighters would then target the building with remote-controlled missiles or rocket-propelled grenades. Most of the casualties sustained by the IDF were caused by rockets or missiles. When Israeli forces retreated the fighters would generally take cover in tunnels or shelters to avoid the shelling or bombardment from the air that would usually follow. When the shelling stopped the fighters would emerge to face the expected Israeli advance. In one case, three Hizbullah fighters took cover in a shelter during an air raid. The shelter received a direct hit and collapsed, killing them. Their bodies could not be recovered for 10 days. Another Hizbullah fighter also became one of the first Lebanese killed by a drone strike during the war.

In spite of the substantial losses, IDF officials denied that there was any intention of withdrawing from the village, without "a clear surrender" of Hizbullah, because it was major stronghold and considered a "symbol of the determination" of the movement. One soldier from the Carmeli brigade was killed and at least 19 were wounded in further heavy clashes in Ayta ash-Sha'b on 5 August. The losses precipitated a much criticized withdrawal of the reserve brigade from the village.

On 6 August, the Defence Minister again expressed his dissatisfaction over the army's inability to conquer Ayta ash-Sha'b. The orders to the IDF to quickly occupy Ayta ash-Sha'b were repeated several times over the coming days. A negotiating team that had been sent to the town to negotiate a peaceful surrender of its defenders returned empty handed on 7 August.

Fighting spreads to Dibil and al-Qawzah 
Israeli forces eventually bypassed Ayta ash-Sha'b and started pushing northward towards the villages of al-Qawzah and Dibil, a few kilometers to the north of the town. Both of the villages were Christian and Hizbullah probably maintained a minimal presence there. The front line was thereby "extended from ash-Shomera-Zar’it [in Israel], over Khallat Warda [near the border] and reaching al-Qawzah and Dibil”.

A heavy PUMA APC was hit by a missile in the village of Dibil on 7 August, killing one soldier and injuring five others.

9 August, a large IDF force was detected by Hizbullah scouts while advancing from al-Qawzah towards Dibil. Local headquarters were alerted and the Israeli force was subjected to artillery and mortar fire, near the Dibil public swimming pool, from positions outside Ayta ash-Sha'b. Hizbullah did not maintain artillery inside the town. An Israeli unit, belonging to the 8219th Engineering Battalion of the 551st Paratrooper Reserve Brigade, took cover in a garage on the outskirts of Dibil. The house was hit by two anti-tank missiles fired from Ayta ash-Sha'b (about 4 kilometers away) and the building collapsed. Nine soldiers were killed and 31 wounded, many of whom were buried under the ruins. Among those killed were Major Natan Yahav, the only senior IDF officer to die in the battle of Ayta ash-Sha'b. The incident was dubbed "The House of Death". Survivors later expressed bitterness at the IDF command, whose "incompetence and stupidity" contributed to the high number of casualties. "In Debel, those nine guys never even had a chance to shoot a single bullet." The casualties had to be carried on stretchers back to Israel.

The same day, a Merkava tank was hit by a missile, fired from close range in Ayta ash-Sha'b. The tank turret was blown off and the tank caught fire. Its four crewmen were killed instantly.

On 10 August, IDF claims to have killed three Hizbullah fighters in Ayta ash-Sha'b.

Ceasefire
On 9 August, General Eisenkott had to inform the government that the army had failed to capture Ayta ash-Sha'b. Prime Minister Ehud Olmert demanded an explanation.

Less than three days before the ceasefire Operation Changing Direction 11 was launched with the aim of pushing further into Lebanese territory. 17 Israeli soldiers died in the fighting around the villages of Haddatha, Yatar, at-Tiri, Rashaf and Ayta az-Zut, well to the north of Ayta ash-Sha'b. There are no reports of any offensive Israeli action against Hizbullah positions in the town itself.

On the last day of the fighting, an IDF infantry force at the Abu Tawil hill in the northern outskirts of the town was hit by an anti-tank missile. Four soldiers were killed and 20 wounded.

By the time the cease-fire took effect on the morning of 14 August the IDF apparently had abandoned all its positions inside Ayta a-Sha'b. Blanford notes: "On the first day of the ceasefire, it was possible to reach [Aita ash-Sha'b]… which lay behind the IDF’s frontline positions in Haddatha, Rashaf and Yatar without even seeing a single IDF soldier." A camera team from al-Jazeera reached the village and interviewed a Hizbullah fighter a few hours after the ceasefire took effect.

Aftermath 
The Israeli army never occupied Ayta ash-Sha'b. According to Harel and Issacharoff, the town became "a symbol of Israel's performance in the war, the village where it all began, where the IDF thrashed about for four weeks and never succeeded in taking." Exum described Hizbullah's "tenacity" in the defense of the border villages as "the biggest surprise of the war" and the performance of the village units as "exceptional".

The Carmeli Brigade pulled a battalion out of the town, after one of its soldiers was killed, in what was described as a "tactical retreat". The performance of the Carmeli Brigade was afterwards singled out (together with another unit, the 366th Division) for particular harsh criticism. It displayed a "lack of determination, an unnecessary retreat and a misunderstanding of the bigger picture. Much of the blame was placed on the top brass, but the [two] brigades were left thoroughly shaken by the war." After the war a committee, headed by Col. (res) Yoram Yair, sharply criticized the conduct of 91st Division during the war, including the battle of Ayta ash-Sha'b. The battle was called "the black hole of the war".

Brig.-Gen. Gal Hirsch, the commanding officer under which the Carmeli Brigade served during the war, was fired a few months after the war.

The commander of the Northern Command, Gen. Udi Adam, was practically fired already on 8 Aug, after the repeated failures to capture Bint Jbeil and Ayta ash-Sha'b. Chief of Staff Halutz sent his deputy, Maj.-Gen. Moshe Kaplinsky, to Northern Command, to serve as his "coordinator" beside Adam. Adam formally resigned from the army in September. Chief of Staff Dan Halutz himself resigned in January 2007.

Veteran Israeli war correspondent Ron Ben-Yishai claimed that the problem was not limited to the commanding officers. He claimed that a "crybaby culture" had developed among the soldiers of the Israeli army. Almost every Israeli offensive operation in the war, including those in Ayta ash-Sha'b, were called off as soon as resistance was encountered and casualties were sustained, even though IDF in almost every clash enjoyed superiority, both in terms of numbers and firepower. Soldiers often abandoned their missions and focused all efforts on evacuating casualties from the battlefield rather than continuing to pursue their objectives.

Gilad Sharon asked in a column in Yedioth Ahronoth after the war: "How could it be that after a month of war, our soldiers were still being wounded among the still-standing houses of the village of Aita al-Shaab,  hundreds of meters from the location of the abduction that sparked the war?"

Casualties 

The Municipality of Ayta ash-Sha’b published a casualty list that included the names of 11 Hizbullah fighters who were killed in the battle of Ayta ash-Sha’b. Eight of these were locals and three were from other localities in Lebanon. Another eleven named fighters were wounded.
The town also suffered eight "civilian martyrs".
These Hizbullah casualties were largely confirmed by other sources: Journalist Simon Assaf (eight locals),  
The Washington Post (eight locals), 
 
Nir Rosen and Hannah Alam of McClatchy (nine locals) and Israeli newspaper 
Yedioth Ahronoth ("around ten" residents, "in addition to other fighters who arrived"). 

Ayta resident Commander Muhammad Wahbi Surour was also named a "martyr of Ayta", but he was killed  in an air strike near the village of Barish further to the north. He was an logistics officer and one of the three highest ranked Hizbullah commanders to die in the war. 
The IDF, on the other hand, claimed that 40 Hizbullah guerrillas were killed in the battle.

Two Hizbullah fighters were taken prisoner by the IDF during the battle of Ayta ash-Sha'b. The captured fighters were not recognized as prisoners-of-war. In September 2006 the two prisoners were put on trial, together with a third prisoner, Mahir Kourani, who was captured a few days later at the village of Shihin. The three were accused of a long series of criminal offenses, including "providing service to an illegal association," "weapons training in Iran and Lebanon without government permission," "conspiracy to commit a crime," and "conspiracy to commit murder" as well as participation in the kidnapping and attempted kidnapping of Israeli soldiers. Before the trial was concluded the three prisoners (including the fourth prisoner, Khadr Zaidan, who was captured at al-Ghandouriya) were released in the 2008 prisoner exchange.

According to a spokesman for the U.N. High Commissioner for Refugees, only 100 of the 1300 houses in the town remained after the war. In spite of the widespread destruction in Ayta ash-Sha'b, there were surprisingly few civilian casualties. According to Lebanese sources only eight civilian residents were killed in the war. The main reason for this seems to have been that the great majority of the civilian population had been evacuated from the town early in the conflict. According to a Human Rights Watch report two of the civilian fatalities were actually killed outside the town. On 19 July Zaynab Salah Jawad, aged 7, and her brother Kawthar, 4, were killed when a 155 mm artillery shell struck the private home in the nearby Christian village of Rumaysh, where the family had sought refuge after being evacuated from Ayta ash-Sha'b. One man was killed 20 July by an missile fired by a helicopter. An elderly couple and their son in his forties were killed the day after when their home was destroyed by an air strike.

The IDF announced that 28 Israeli soldiers, five of them officers, were killed in 33 days of fighting in and around the town. Five of them died in the illfated rescue attempt at the border on 12 July, thirteen fell inside the town of Ayta and ten were killed in the nearby village of Dibil).

Islamic Resistance fatalities 
The Municipality of Ayta ash-Sha’b published the following casualty list.

Fighters from Ayta ash-Sha’b
 al-Sayyid Yousuf Muhammad as-Sayyid
 Muhammad Ni’ma Rida 
 Muhammad Kamal Surour
 Younis Ya’qoub Surour
 Shadi Hani Sa’d
 Muhammad Mousa Surour
 Wajeeh Muhammad Tuhaini
 al-Sayyid Hisham Muhsin Murtada

Fighters from other Lebanese localities
 Hassan Qa’iq 
 Ali Abdul-Muhsin Khalil
 Hasan Muhammad Muhsin

Fighters from Ayta ash-Sha’b killed in other battles of 2006 war
 Commander Muhammad Wahbi Surour

Islamic Resistance prisoners-of-war 
 Muhammad Surour
 Hussein Suleiman (captured in Ayta but a resident of Beirut)

Lebanese civilian fatalities 
 Hajj Rida Rida
 Hajja Haniya Surour
 Hajj Ahmad Rida
 Ahmad Abdul-Nabi
 Hajj Hassan Rida
 Ali Hassan Daqdouq 
 Kawthar Salah Jawad (killed in Rumaysh)
 Zaynab Salah Jawad (killed in Rumaysh)

Israeli fatalities 
12 July 2006
 Staff-Sergeant Alexei Kushnirski (tank commander, 82nd Bat. of the 7th Brigade), 21, of Ness Ziona
 Staff-Sergeant Yaniv Bar-on (2nd Bat. of the 7th Brigade), 20, of Maccabim
 Sergeant Gadi Mosayev (2nd Bat. of the 7th Brigade), 20, of Akko
 Sergeant Shlomi Yirmiyahu (2nd Bat. of the 7th Brigade), 20, of Rishon LeZion
 Sergeant Nimrod Cohen (Nahal Brigade), 19, of Mitzpe Shalem

1 August 2006
 Lieutenant Ilan Gabai (Paratroopers 101 Bat.), 21, of Kiryat Tivon
 Staff-Sergeant Yonatan Einhorn (Paratroopers 101 Bat.), 22, of Moshav Gimzo
 Staff-Sergeant Michael Levin (Paratroopers 890 Bat.), 21, of Jerusalem

2 August 2006
 Sergeant Adi Cohen (Paratrooper 101 Bat.), 18, of Hadera

5 August 2006
 Corporal (res.) Kiril Kashdan (Carmeli brigade), 26, of Haifa

7 August 2006
 Staff-Sergeant Philip Mosko (Paratroopers 101 Bat.), 21 

9 August 2006
 Captain (res.) Gilad Stukelman (847th reserve brigade), 26, of Moshav Timrat
 Sergeant-Major.(res.) Noam Goldman (847th reserve brigade), 27, of Tel Aviv
 Staff-Sergeant (res.) Nir Cohen (847th reserve brigade), 22, of Maccabim
 Staff-Sergeant (res.) Ben (Binyamin) Sela (847th reserve brigade), 24, of Koranit

 Major (res.) Natan Yahav (551st Paratrooper Brigade), 36, of Kiryat Ono
 Captain (res.) Yoni (Leon) Shmucher (551st Paratrooper Brigade), 30, of Bet Nehemia
 Sergeant-Major (res.) Asher Reuven Novik (551st Paratrooper Brigade), 36, of Kanaf
 Staff-Sergeant Adi Salim (551st Paratrooper Brigade), 22, of Beit Hashmonai
 Sergeant-Major (res.) Elad Dan (551st Paratrooper Brigade), 25, of Kibbutz Eilot
 Sergeant-Major (res.) Gilad Zussman (551st Paratrooper Brigade), 26, of Eli
 Sergeant-Major (res.) Idan Kobi (551st Paratrooper Brigade), 26, of Eilat
 Sergeant-Major (res.) Naor Kalo (551st Paratrooper Brigade), 25, of Kibbutz Maagan Michael
 Sergeant-Major (res.) Nimrod Segev (551st Paratrooper Brigade), 28, of Ramat Gan

13 August 2006
 Lieutenant (res.) Eliel Ben-Yehuda (Carmeli brigade), 24, of Kfar Tavor
 Sergeant-Major (res.) Guy Hasson (Carmeli brigade), 24, of Moshav Na'omi
 Staff-Sergeant (res.) Yaniv Shainbrum (Carmeli brigade), 24, of Mei Ami
 Staff-Sergeant (res.) Elad Shlomo Ram (Carmeli brigade), 31, of Haifa

References

External links

Bibliography 
 
 Biddle, Stephen and Jeffrey A. Friedman, "THE 2006 LEBANON CAMPAIGN AND THE FUTURE OF WARFARE: IMPLICATIONS FOR ARMY AND DEFENSE POLICY", Strategic Studies Institute, U.S. Army War College, September 2008
 Blanford, Nicholas, "HIZBULLAH AND THE IDF: ACCEPTING NEW REALITIES ALONG THE BLUE LINE" in THE SIXTH WAR ISRAEL’S INVASION OF LEBANON, The MIT Electronic Journal of Middle East Studies Vol. 6, Summer 2006
 Crooke, Alastair and Mark Perry, HOW HEZBOLLAH DEFEATED ISRAEL, Asia Times
PART 1: Winning the intelligence war, 12 October 2006
PART 2: Winning the ground war, 13 October 2006
PART 3: The political war, 14 October 2006
  [The study was supported by Military Intelligence, the Operations Division of the IDF General Staff, the IDF Spokesperson and the legal experts of the IDF and the Ministry of Foreign Affairs.]
 Exum, Andrew, "Hizballah at War – A Military Assessment", Washington Institute for Near East Policy, Policy Focus No. 63 | December 2006
 
 Human Rights Watch (HRW), "Why They Died", Civilian Casualties in Lebanon during the 2006 War, September 2007
 Human Rights Watch (HRW), "Flooding South Lebanon", Israel's Use of Cluster Munitions in Lebanon in July and August 2006, February 2008
 Matthews, Matt M., "We Were Caught Unprepared: The 2006 Hezbollah-Israeli War", The Long War Series Occasional Paper 26, U.S. Army Combined Arms Center Combat Studies Institute Press Fort Leavenworth, Kansas, 2006
 Rapaport, Amir, אש על כוחותינו: כך הכשלנו את עצמנו במלחמת לבנון השנייה (Friendly Fire, How We Failed Ourselves in the Second Lebanon War), Sifriya Ma'ariv, 2007
 
Chapter 1 Hannibal
 The final Winograd Commission report (Hebrew)

Battles of the 2006 Lebanon War
July 2006 events in Asia
August 2006 events in Asia
Bint Jbeil District